Gleisdreieck (Triangle of Rails) is the fourth studio album by German recording artist Joy Denalane. It was released by Nesola Records on March 3, 2017 worldwide and in German-speaking Europe.

Track listing
Credits adapted from the liner notes of Gleisdreieck.

Charts

Release history

References

External links
 JoyDenalane.com — official site

2017 albums
Joy Denalane albums